Tirfergus House was a mansion house south of Drumlemble, Kintyre, Argyll and Bute, Scotland. The house has been demolished. Blockwork incorporated into a farm outhouse has a commemorative panel bearing the date 1677.

Notes

Houses in Argyll and Bute
1677 establishments in Scotland